Anupam Roy (born 29 March 1982) is an Indian singer, singer-songwriter, music director, composer, songwriter, guitarist, playback singer from Kolkata, West Bengal. He made his debut with Amake Amar Moto Thakte Dao & Benche Thakar Gaan, which appeared on the soundtrack of the 2010 Bengali film Autograph. Since then, he has gone on to compose, write lyrics and sing for many Bengali films. In 2015, he made his Bollywood debut, composing the songs and score for Piku. He was nominated for the 61st Filmfare Award for Best Music Director, and won the 61st Filmfare Award for Best Background Score for Piku. Winner of four filmfare  awards, he is a recipient of 64th National Film Award for Best Lyrics for the song Tumi Jaake Bhalobasho.

Music
Two of his songs featured in the Bengali film Autograph (2010) by Srijit Mukherji. Roy wrote and composed Benche Thakar Gaan (বেঁচে থাকার গান), sung by Rupam Islam & also by himself in another version and Amake Amar Moto Thakte Dao (আমাকে আমার মতো থাকতে দাও), which he sang himself. Roy subsequently debuted as music director for the Bengali movie Chalo Paltai (2011). In the same year movies like Baishe Srabon, Rang Milanti released where he continued his work as music director, lyricist and vocalist. In 2012, Hemlock Society released where he worked as music director/lyricist/vocalist. Songs like Ekhon Anek Raat & Amar Mawte catapulted his success to another level. 2014, marked the release of 4 films where he worked as music director. Songs from Highway and Chotushkone did remarkably well on music charts. Boba Tunnel and Bawshonto Eshe Gechhe were amongst other songs by Roy.

He debuted in Bollywood in 2015 as a music director, singer and lyricist, Piku, directed by Shoojit Sircar.
 In 2015, he married his long-time girlfriend Piya Chakraborty.

Apart from film music, Roy has four solo albums. He released Durbine Chokh Rakhbona (দূরবীনে চোখ রাখব না), his debut album in 2012 which contains tracks like Bijli Baati, Tistaan and also the original version of Benche Thakar Gaan. He followed it up with Dwitiyo Purush(দ্বিতীয় পুরুষ) in 2013 with a music video of Adbhut Mugdhota.
His third album Bakyobageesh was released in 2014. 2014 also marked Anupam Roy's first Live Concert in Mumbai at the Sarvajanin Durgotsav hosted by Powai Bengali Welfare Organisation (PBWA).

As an independent artist, he and his band released his first English single Second Sex in May 2013.
In 2015, he did his first Coke Studio (India) episode. He successfully recreated Moner Manush by Lalon Fakir with an additional Hindi verse written and composed by him.

In 2016, he composed two songs for the Hindi film Pink. In 2017, he composed for the Hindi films Running Shaadi (one song) and Dear Maya.

On 14 February 2017, Anupam released his fourth studio album Ebar Morle Gachh Hawbo. The album consists of songs such as  Amar Shohor, Oestrogen, Choitrer Kafon, Rock n Roll and Byatha Lage.

Discography
Roy's solo albums as a singer-songwriter.

Singles as singer-songwriter

Nirbasoner Gaan was written jointly with Chandril Bhattacharya, Anindya Chattopadhyay & Srijato
Bhalo Theko 19 was a joint composition with Pratyush Banerjee
Michael Vidyasagar Sangbad was jointly sung with Anirban Bhattacharya
Manush Bhalo Nei's rap part Written & Sung by Cizzy
Bone Jodi Phutlo Kusum & Ekla Cholo Re are Rabindra Sangeets

Filmography

As Lyricist-Music Director

Roy has worked as lyricist, music director & singer for the following films.

As Playback Artist

Roy worked only as a playback artist in the following films (for other lyricists & composers)

Documentaries
 Warrior Prince (2011) – singer/lyricist/music director;

Theatre
 Nariyal Paani (2009) – music director/singer/actor
 Bikele Bhorer Shorshe Phool (2011) – music director/lyricist/singer

Guest Performance
 Opare Thakbo Ami (2015) at Zee Bangla Song Connection
 Ami Banglay Gaan Gai (2021) by Protul Mukhopadhyay , duet with Piya Chakraborty at Uribaba

Jingles
 Jibon Gorar Gaan (2012) for George Telegraph S.C. – music, lyrics & vocals
 Ei Samay Theme Song (2012) for Ei Samay Sangbadpatra – music, lyrics & vocals
Mishti Manei Banchharam (2014) for Banchharam Sweets – music, lyrics & vocals
 Nestle Baby & Me (2015) for Nestle India – music
 Songe Srijit (2015) for Songe Srijit TV Show Colors Bangla – music, lyrics & vocals
 Hero Come Home Safe (2016) for Hero MotoCorp- music & vocals
 Amader Balaram (2016) for Balaram Mullick & Radharaman Mullick – music, lyrics & vocals
 Wild Life Theme Music (2016) for Wild Life Film Festival
 Release The Pressure (2017) for Mirinda India – music
 Nomoshkar Kolkata (2017) for Central (Future Group) – music, lyrics & vocals
 Maa (2017) for (JSW Cement) – music, lyrics & vocals
 Tera Mera Yeh Pyaar (2017) for P.C. Chandra Jewellers – music
 Big Bazaar Pujo Song (2017) for Big Bazaar – music, lyrics & vocals
 Royal Bengal Tiger Cafe (2018) for Royal Bengal Tiger Cafe – music
 Tumi Kothay – Pujo with Pantaloons (2018) for Pantaloons Fashion & Retail – music, lyrics & vocals
 Subhodrishti Title Track (2018) – music, lyrics & vocals
 Missing Stars of Pujo (2018) for Bharti Airtel – music, lyrics & vocals
 Daao Khule Daao (2018) theme song for Behala Notun Dal pujo – music, lyrics & vocals
 Drishtikon (2019) theme song for Tridhara Sanmilani pujo – music, lyrics* & vocals
 It's a magical feeling (2019) for woodlands Hospital – music, lyrics & vocals
 Chhoto Chhoto Paye (2020) for WBCPCR – music, lyrics & vocals with Iman Chakraborty, Anirban Bhattacharya, Parambrata Chattopadhyay & Rafiath Rashid Mithila
 Jiboner Rong (2021) for Asian Paints – vocals with Lagnajita Chakraborty, Rupam Islam, Lopamudra Mitra
 Brides of India (2021) wedding anthem for Malabar Gold & Diamonds – music
 Shera Sajer Shera Stop (2021) pujo jingle for Shoppers Stop – Vocals
 Pujo Pujo Gondho Akashe (2022) pujo jingle for Reliance Trends - Music, lyrics & vocals

The Anupam Roy Band
Roy's live performance is backed by The Anupam Roy Band:
 Current members
 Anupam Roy – Singer-Songwriter
 Rishabh Ray – Guitar 
 Kaustav Biswas (Rono) – Bass
 Nabarun Bose – Keyboards/Backing vocals/Music Producer
 Sandipan Parial – Drums
 Rana Singharoy – Manager
 Shomi Chatterjee – Sound Engineer

 Past members
 Sayan Banerjee – Guitar (Oct 2010 – March 2012)
 Subhodip Banerjee – Guitar (March 2012 – Oct 2014)
 Roheet Mukherjee – Bass (Feb 2011 – Oct 2014)

Writings
Roy's writings have been featured in various online & print magazines & newspapers. He has helped in the running of an online Bengali portal named Boipara(বইপাড়া) along with visual artist, Samit Roy. Anupam Roy maintains a blog, [Alternative Bangla Print]. 
Published in print, major little magazines
 The Bengali magazine, Kaurab (কৌরব) published his work, Amader Beche Thaka (আমাদের বেঁচে থাকা), in the open prose category of its August 2010 issue.
 Kaurab (কৌরব) published his work, Paati Lebu (পাতি লেবু), in the open prose category of its August 2011 issue.
 Kaurab (কৌরব) published his poems in its February 2012, 2013 and 2014 issues.
 Kaurab (কৌরব) published his work, Poster, in the prose category of its August 2012 issue.
 Kaurab (কৌরব) published his work, Kabar Sangee (কবর সঙ্গী), in the prose category of its August 2013 issue.
 Kaurab (কৌরব) published his work, Eriyali (এরিয়ালি), in the prose category of its August 2015 issue.
 DaakBangla.com(ডাকবাংলা.কম) publishes his monthly column, Mackie (ম্যাকি).
 DaakBangla.com(ডাকবাংলা.কম) published his work, Lutiye Pora Nokkhotro (লুটিয়ে পড়া নক্ষত্র), in the prose category of its June 2021 issue.
 DaakBangla.com(ডাকবাংলা.কম) published his work, Ja Kichhu Sundor (যা কিছু সুন্দর), in the prose category of its Book Fair 2022 issue.

Books 
 "Sara Raat Kete Jaay Tor Kawtha Bhebe (সারা রাত কেটে যায় তোর কথা ভেবে)" – his first book of Bengali poems was published by Saptarshi Prakashani, in Kolkata Book Fair, 2012.
 "Chhowache Kolom (ছোঁয়াচে কলম)" – second book of Bengali poems, published by Ananda Publishers, Kolkata, 2013
 "Shomoyer Baire (সময়ের বাইরে)" – debut Bengali novel, published by Deys Publishing, Kolkata, 2014
 "Anupamkawtha (অনুপমকথা)" – a collection of 25 essays published in Ebela newspaper, published by Saptarshi Prakashani, in Kolkata Book Fair, 2015
 "Antony O Chandrabindoo (অ্যান্টনি ও চন্দ্রবিন্দু)" – graphic novel, published by Deep Prakashani, Kolkata, 2015 (Illustrations by Sambuddha Bishee)
 "Mon o Mejaj (মন ও মেজাজ)" – third book of Bengali poems, published by Karigor Publishers, Kolkata, 2016
 "Amader Benche Thaka (আমাদের বেঁচে থাকা)" – a collection of short stories, published by Kaurab Prakashani, in Kolkata Book Fair, 2018
 "Anupamkawtha O Onyanyo (অনুপমকথা ও অন্যান্য)" – a collection of essays, published by Karigar Prakashani, Kolkata, 2018
 "Nijer Shawbde Kaaj Koro (নিজের শব্দে কাজ করো)" – fourth book of Bengali poems, published by Deys Publishing, Kolkata 2020
 "Mackie (ম্যাকি)" – a collection of first 10 Mackie columns published in DaakBangla.com, published by DaakBangla & Deys Publishing, Kolkata 2022
 "Bangalore-e Antony (ব্যাঙ্গালোরে অ্যান্টনি)" – graphic novel, published by Deep Prakashan, Kolkata, 2023 (Illustrations by Shuvo Chakraborty)
 "Brisho Boshe Thake (বৃষ বসে থাকে)" – Fifth book of Bengali poems, published by Ananda Publishers (Signet Press), Kolkata 2023

Newspaper 
 Anupam was a regular columnist for Bengali newspaper Ebela (এবেলা) from September 2012 to October 2016
 He also writes articles for Pratidin (রোববার)

Graphic Novel
Roy is the creator of the Bengali graphic novel character Antony. He writes the story and the dialogues for it. Sambuddha Bishee is the illustrator. The first adventure of Antony (Antony o Chandrabindoo) started getting published in Bengali newspaper magazine Pratidin (রোববার) from July 2014 on a weekly basis. In 2022  8 years after publishing Antony's first adventure; Roy brings back him in an online magazine Daakbangla named 'Bangalore-e Antony'. This time the illustration is created by Suvo Chakraborty.

Audio Book
Roy first time recorded his own poems for Storytel in the year 2021. The poems are from his own book Nijer Shawbde Kaaj Koro's 'Raat Series'. With a BGM composed by Prabuddha Banerjee & Sound design-mix by Shomi Chatterjee

Other activities
Roy has written & directed two short films, Tiebreaker (2009) and Mind Radio (2010), both produced by TIIMMC. He is a gold medal recipient and is a holder of the Bachelor of Engineering degree in Electronics and Telecommunication Engineering from Jadavpur University. He used to work for Texas Instruments India, Bangalore as an analog circuit design engineer from 2004 (July) to 2011 (March).

Acting
Roy's career as an actor.

Awards and recognitions
 Anandalok Special Jury Award for 'The Most Popular Singer, 2010'
 Heritage Samman For Legendary Personalities, (Best upcoming talent, 2010)
 Bangla Sangeet Award (Anandabazar Patrika) – Best new Lyricist (2010), Best new Song (2010) – Amake Amar Moto Thakte Dao (আমাকে আমার মত থাকতে দাও)
 Big Bangla Movie Awards 2011 – Best Lyricist – Amake Amar Moto Thakte Dao (আমাকে আমার মত থাকতে দাও)
 Zee Bangla Gourab Award 2011 – Best Lyricist – Amake Amar Moto Thakte Dao (আমাকে আমার মত থাকতে দাও)
 Bose Tele Cine Awards (Pulok Bandopadhyay Memorial Award) 2011 – Best Lyricist – Amake Amar Moto Thakte Dao (আমাকে আমার মত থাকতে দাও)
 Star Jalsa Entertainment Award 2011 – 'Agami Diner Star'
 STAR Ananda Shera Bangali Award 2011 – 'Notun Mukh (Best Newcomer)'
 Big Bangla Rising Star Award 2011 – 'Best Singer (Male)' & 'Role Model'
 Anandalok Awards for Best Song 2011 for 'Bariye Daao Tomar Haat (Chalo Paltai)'
 Mirchi Music Awards Bangla 2012 – 6 awards, upcoming lyricist (Ekbar Bawl), best lyricist (jury & popular) for Bengali Films, best film album 'Baishey Sraabon' (jury and popular) and best song "Gobheere Jao"
 Bangla Sangeet Puroshkar 2012 (Anandabazar Patrika & Friends 91.9FM) – Best music director (Baishey Sraabon), Best song (Je Kota Din), Best film album (Baishey Sraabon)
 ABP Ananda Shera Bangali Award 2012 – Music Category
 12th Tele Cine Awards 2012 – Best male playback for "Ekbar Bawl" (একবার বল) from Baishe Srabon
 Zee Bangla Gourab Award 2012 – Best Lyricist – Bariye Daao & Best Music Director – Baishe Srabon
 IBFA 2012 – Best Singer – "Ekbar Bawl"
 IBFCA 2012 – Best lyricist, music director & singer – all for Baishe Srabon
 Anandalok Best Song Award 2012 for "Ekhon Anek Raat" from Hemlock Society
 Mirchi Music Awards Bangla 2013 – Best song 'Ekhon Anek Raat' & best album Hemlock Society
 13th Tele Cine Awards (Pulok Bandopadhyay Memorial Award) 2013 – Best lyricist – 'Ekhon Anek Raat'
 ETV Bangla Sangeet Samman 2013 – Best Male Playback – 'Ekhon Anek Raat'
 BFJA 2013 – Best Male Playback – 'Ekhon Anek Raat'
 Ebela – Ami Amar Moto (আমি আমার মত) Samman 2013
 Zee Bangla Gourab Award 2013–14 – Best Lyricist – Ekhon Anek Raat & Best Playback Singer – Ekhon Anek Raat
 61st Filmfare Award for Best Background Score 2016 – Piku
 Mirchi Music Awards Bangla 2015 – Best Song 'Bondhu Chol' & Royal Stag Make it Large Award
 West Bengal Film Journalists' Association Awards 2017 – Best Music Director – Praktan & Best Lyricist – Tumi Jaake Bhalobasho
 Filmfare Award East 2017 – Best Music Album – Praktan & Best Lyricist – Tumi Jaake Bhalobasho
 Mirchi Music Awards Bangla 2016 – Best Song (Critics Choice) – Tumi Jaake Bhalobasho, Best Album (Critics Choice) – Shaheb Bibi Golaam, Best Lyrics – Tumi Jaake Bhalobasho & Best Music Composer – Tumi Jaake Bhalobasho
 64th National Film Awards 2016 – Best Lyrics – Tumi Jaake Bhalobasho
 16th Tele Cine Awards 2017 – Best Lyrics & Best Music Director for Tumi Jaake Bhalobasho
SRL Award 2018 – "Composer of the Decade"
 Filmfare Award East 2018 – Best Music Album – Projapoti Biskut
 Mirchi Music Awards Bangla 2017 – Best Lyrics – Keno Erokom Kichhu Holona, Best Album (Listeners' Choice) – Maacher Jhol & Best Album (Critics Choice) – Projapoti Biskut
 17th Tele Cine Awards 2018 – Best Lyrics for Dawttok
 West Bengal Film Journalists' Association Awards 2019 – Best Music Director – Drishtikone & Best Male Playback Singer – Amar Dukkhogulo
 Mirchi Music Awards Bangla 2018 – Best Song (Listeners' Choice) – Hridoyer Rong & Best Album (Listeners' Choice) – Ghare and Baire
NABC Film Festival 2019 – Best Music for Uma
 West Bengal Film Journalists' Association Awards 2020 – Best Music Director – Shahjahan Regency
 Tumi Annanya 2021 – Excellence in Women Empowerment through Indian Music
 FILMFARE AWARD BANGLA 2021 – Best Music Album for the film "Prem-Tame"
 WBFJA AWARD 2021 – Best Lyricist for Jawlphoring 2.0 from the film "Prem-Tame"
 TELE CINE AWARD 2022 – Best Male Playback Singer – Aalote Aalote Dhaka from the film Konttho

References

External links

 Poems by Anupam Roy
 

Living people
Indian male singer-songwriters
Indian singer-songwriters
Bengali singers
Jadavpur University alumni
1982 births
Singers from Kolkata
Indian Hindus
Best Lyrics National Film Award winners
Bengali musicians